Navi Lubana is an Indian music video director. He is best known for his music videos like Sunroof, Giddha, Open Head, Mere Yaar, Chann and Thok Thar di.

Career 
Lubana was born in Jalandhar. Lubana has done MBA in International Business & Finance. He made his directing debut with Chann Song. In 2018, he directed a video of Song Thok Thar Di but rose to prominence with his directed video of Song Open Head By Singer Elly Mangat & Shehnaz Kaur Gill.

As a model
Lubana worked as a model in the song "Nakhre" by Jassie Gill, "Breezer" by Armaan Bedil, "ByGod" by B Jay Randhawa, "Door" by Kanwar Chahal, "5-7 Yaar" by Karan Randhawa and "Ja ve Mundya" by Ranjit Bawa.

Selected music videos 
 Giddha - Elly Mangat & Afsana Khan
 Sunroof - Elly Mangat & Sultaan
 Thok Thar Di - Taji
 Chann - Akhilesh Nagar
 Mere Yaar - Sultaan
 Thok Thar Di 2 -taji
 Openhead - Elly Mangat & Shehnaz Kaur Gill
 Cops - Taji
 Mirror - Gajjan Singh
 Nattiyan - Elly Mangat
 Charche - Elly Mangat & Bhinder Virk
 Dollar Vs Yaari - Raja
 High Kirdar - Taji
 Jatt Gang - Jgill

References 

Living people
Year of birth missing (living people)
Indian music video directors
People from Jalandhar